The Egyptian International Beverage Company (EIBCO) is an Egyptian brewery founded in October 2005. EIBCO products that include the Luxor brand are in part distributed by Cheers, a beverage shop and delivery service. EIBCO is the 2nd major brewery in Egypt after Al-Ahram Beverage Company.

See also 
Egyptian wine
Beer in Egypt

Beer in Egypt
Food companies of Egypt
Breweries
Food and drink companies established in 2005
2005 establishments in Egypt